Historical regions (or historical areas) are geographical regions which, at some point in history, had a cultural, ethnic, linguistic or political basis, regardless of latter-day borders. There are some historical regions that can be considered as "active", for example: Moravia, which is held by the Czech Republic, is both a recognized part of the country as well as a historical region. They are used as delimitations for studying and analysing social development of period-specific cultures without any reference to contemporary political, economic or social organisations.
The fundamental principle underlying this view is that older political and mental structures exist which exercise greater influence on the spatial-social identity of individuals than is understood by the contemporary world, bound to and often blinded by its own worldview - e.g. the focus on the nation-state.

Definitions of regions vary, and regions can include macroregions such as Europe, territories of traditional states or smaller microregional areas. Geographic proximity is generally the required precondition for the emergence of a regional identity. In Europe, regional identities are often derived from the Migration Period, but for the contemporary era are also often related to the territorial transformations that followed World War I as well as those that followed the Cold War.

Some regions are entirely invented, such as the Middle East, which was coined in 1902 by a military strategist, Alfred Thayer Mahan, to refer to the area of the Persian Gulf.

Lists
 Anatolia
 Armenia
 Central Europe
 Denmark (Lands / Districts)
 Finland (Historical / Former)
 France
 Greece (Ancient / Traditional / Geographic)
 Latvia
 Portugal
 Serbia
 Sweden (Lands / Provinces)
 United Kingdom
 England
 Hen Ogledd
 Scotland (Provinces / Shires)
 Wales
 United States

References

Works cited
 Sven Tägil, (ed.), Regions in Central Europe: The Legacy of History, C. Hurst & Co. Publishers, 1999
 Marko Lehti, David James Smith, Post-Cold War Identity Politics: Northern and Baltic Experiences, Routledge, 2003 
 Compiled by V. M. Kotlyakov, A. I. Komarova, Elsevier's dictionary of geography: in English, Russian, French, Spanish, German, Elsevier, 2006 
 Martin W. Lewis, Kären Wigen, The Myth of Continents: A Critique of Metageography, University of California Press, 1997

Further reading
 Susan Smith-Peter, Imagining Russian Regions: Subnational Identity and Civil Society in Nineteenth-Century Russia, Brill, 2017